Western guilt implies a failure of collective responsibility in the Western hemisphere and may refer to 
Western betrayal, prelude and aftermath of World War II
White guilt, collective guilt